The Medak District bus-train collision took place on the morning of 24 July 2014 at Masaipet in the Medak district of Telangana state in India.  A bus ferrying at least 40 children to school collided with the Nanded-Hyderabad Passenger  at an unmanned level crossing.

Sixteen students, aged between three and fourteen, the bus driver and the cleaner were killed in the accident. Twenty other children were taken to hospital in Kompally, near Hyderabad. Early reports said that the bus driver, Bhikshapati Goud, was on his cellphone at the time of the collision.

Telangana Chief Minister K. Chandrasekhar Rao ordered officials to take care of the children and ensure they received the best possible medical treatment, and offered his condolences.  However, it took some time for emergency services to arrive on the scene; local people attempted to rescue the victims in the meantime.

References

2014 disasters in India
Level crossing incidents in India
Medak district
Railway accidents in 2014
Transport in Telangana
July 2014 events in India
Disasters in Telangana